Nematocarcinus tenuisrostris, or long-legged shrimp, is a species of shrimp known from the Indian and Pacific Oceans.

References

Caridea